Sreenivasan Jain is an Indian journalist who worked for NDTV from 1995 - Jan 2023. He was one of the prominent faces of NDTV, and during his three-decade career with the news television, served as the anchor of NDTV’s popular programmes, like Reality Check, Truth vs Hype etc. He was also the channel's Group Editor. He was NDTV's Mumbai bureau chief from 2003 to 2008. He was also briefly Managing Editor of NDTV's business channel, Profit. He is also an Op-ed columnist for the Business Standard newspaper. An Op-ed column in The Hoot, an independent South Asian media watchdog, praised Jain's television coverage of the 2013 Muzaffarnagar riots. Jain is the grandson of M A Sreenivasan, a minister in the Princely State of Mysore, and the son of Devaki Jain and Lakshmi Chand Jain. On January 28, 2023, Sreenivasan Jain announced that he is quitting the channel after a nearly three-decade-long career.

Awards
Jain won the 2006 Best Anchor News/Current Affairs award instituted by the Indian Television Academy.
In September 2014, Jain won the Ramnath Goenka award for 'Journalist of the Year'.
In April 2015, Jain won the 'Journalist of the Year' award at the RedInk journalism awards, given by the Press Club, Mumbai.

References

Living people
Date of birth missing (living people)
Indian male television journalists
Indian columnists
NDTV Group
Year of birth missing (living people)
Managing editors